Martyn Ian Gidley (born 30 September 1968) is a former English first-class cricketer who played in England and South Africa. Born in Leicester, he was educated at Loughborough Grammar School, where he now is a master.

References

1968 births
Living people
Cricketers from Leicester
People educated at Loughborough Grammar School
English cricketers
Leicestershire cricketers
Griqualand West cricketers
Free State cricketers